The 2008 Mumbai attacks (also referred to as 26 November attacks or 26/11) were a series of terrorist attacks that took place in November 2008, when 10 members of Lashkar-e-Taiba, an Islamist terrorist organisation from Pakistan, carried out 12 coordinated shooting and bombing attacks lasting four days across Mumbai. The attacks, which drew widespread global condemnation, began on Wednesday 26 November and lasted until Saturday 29 November 2008. A total of 175 people died, including nine attackers, and more than 300 were wounded.

Eight of the attacks occurred in South Mumbai: at Chhatrapati Shivaji Maharaj Terminus, the Oberoi Trident, the Taj Palace & Tower, the Leopold Cafe, the Cama Hospital, the Nariman House, the Metro Cinema, and in a lane behind the Times of India building and St. Xavier's College. There was also an explosion at Mazagaon, in Mumbai's port area, and in a taxi at Vile Parle. By the early morning of 28 November, all sites except for the Taj Hotel had been secured by the Mumbai Police and security forces. On 29 November, India's National Security Guards (NSG) conducted Operation Black Tornado to flush out the remaining attackers; it culminated in the death of the last remaining attackers at the Taj Hotel and ended the attacks.

Before his execution in 2012, Ajmal Kasab, the sole surviving attacker, disclosed that the attackers were members of the terrorist group Lashkar-e-Taiba, and were controlled from Pakistan, corroborating initial claims from the Indian Government. Pakistan later confirmed that the sole surviving perpetrator of the attacks was a Pakistani citizen. On 9 April 2015, the foremost ringleader of the attacks, Zakiur Rehman Lakhvi, was released on bail and disappeared; he was arrested again in Lahore on 2 January 2021. In 2018, former Pakistani prime minister Nawaz Sharif suggested that the Pakistani government played a role in the 2008 Mumbai attack. In 2022, one of the masterminds of the attack, Sajid Majeed Mir —who had been earlier claimed to be dead by the Pakistan Government— was convicted for funding terrorist activities by an anti-terrorism court in Pakistan.

Background 

There had been many terrorist attacks in Mumbai since the 13 coordinated bomb explosions that killed 257 people and injured 700 on 12 March 1993. The 1993 attacks were carried out in revenge for earlier religious riots that killed many Muslims.

On 6 December 2002, a blast in a BEST bus near Ghatkopar station killed two people and injured 28. The bombing occurred on the 10th anniversary of the demolition of the Babri Mosque in Ayodhya. A bicycle bomb exploded near the Vile Parle station in Mumbai, killing one person and injuring 25 on 27 January 2003, a day before the visit of the Prime Minister of India Atal Bihari Vajpayee to the city. On 13 March 2003, a day after the 10th anniversary of the 1993 Bombay bombings, a bomb exploded in a train compartment near the Mulund station, killing 10 people and injuring 70. On 28 July 2003, a blast in a BEST bus in Ghatkopar killed 4 people and injured 32. On 25 August 2003, two bombs exploded in South Mumbai, one near the Gateway of India and the other at Zaveri Bazaar in Kalbadevi. At least 44 people were killed and 150 injured. On 11 July 2006, seven bombs exploded within 11 minutes on the Suburban Railway in Mumbai, killing 209 people, including 22 foreigners and more than 700 injured. According to the Mumbai Police, the bombings were carried out by Lashkar-e-Taiba (LeT) and Students Islamic Movement of India (SIMI).

Training 
A group of men sometimes stated as 24 and at other times 26, received training in marine warfare at a remote camp in mountainous Muzaffarabad in Pakistan. Part of the training was reported to have taken place on the Mangla Dam reservoir in Pakistan.

The recruits went through the following stages of training, according to Indian and US media reports:
Psychological: Indoctrination to Islamist Jihadi ideas, including imagery of atrocities suffered by Muslims in India, Chechnya, Palestine, and across the globe.
Basic Combat: Lashkar's basic combat training and methodology course, the Daura Aam.
Advanced Training: Selected to undergo advanced combat training at a camp near Mansehra, a course the organisation calls the Daura Khaas. According to an unnamed source at the US Defense Department, this includes advanced weapons and explosives training supervised by former members of the Pakistan Army, along with survival training and further indoctrination.
Commando Training: Finally, an even smaller group was selected for specialized commando tactics training, and marine navigation training was given to the Fedayeen unit that was selected, in order to target Mumbai.

From the recruits, ten were handpicked for the Mumbai mission. They also received training in swimming and sailing, besides the use of high-end weapons and explosives under the supervision of LeT commanders. According to a media report citing an unnamed former Defence Department Official of the US, the intelligence agencies of the US had determined that former officers from Pakistan's Army and Inter-Services Intelligence agency assisted actively and continuously in training. They were given blueprints of all the four targets – The Taj Mahal Palace Hotel, Oberoi Trident, Nariman House, and Chhatrapati Shivaji Maharaj Terminus.

Attacks 

The first events were detailed around 20:00 Indian Standard Time (IST) on 26 November, when 10 men in inflatable speedboats came ashore at two locations in Colaba. They reportedly told local Marathi-speaking fishermen who asked them who they were to "mind their own business" before they split up and headed two different ways. The fishermen's subsequent report to the police department received little response and local police failed to act.

Chhatrapati Shivaji Maharaj Terminus 

The Chhatrapati Shivaji Maharaj Terminus (CSMT) was attacked by two gunmen, Ismail Khan and Ajmal Kasab. Kasab was later caught alive by the police and identified by eyewitnesses. The attacks began around 21:30 when the two men entered the passenger hall and opened fire using AK-47 rifles. The attackers killed 58 people and injured 104 others, their assault ending at about 22:45. Security forces and emergency services arrived shortly afterwards. Announcements by a railway announcer, Vishnu Dattaram Zende, alerted passengers to leave the station and saved many lives. The two gunmen fled the scene and fired at pedestrians and police officers in the streets, killing eight police officers. The attackers passed a police station. Knowing that they were outgunned against the heavily armed terrorists, the police officers at the station, instead of confronting the terrorists, decided to switch off the lights and secure the gates.

The attackers then headed towards Cama Hospital with intent to kill patients, but the hospital staff locked all of the patient wards. A team of the Mumbai Anti-Terrorist Squad led by police chief Hemant Karkare searched the Chhatrapati Shivaji Terminus and then left in pursuit of Kasab and Khan. Kasab and Khan opened fire on the vehicle in a lane next to the hospital, and received return fire in response. Karkare, Vijay Salaskar, Ashok Kamte and three of their officers were killed. The only survivor, Constable Arun Jadhav, was severely wounded. Kasab and Khan seized the police vehicle but later abandoned it and seized a passenger car instead. They then ran into a police roadblock, which had been set up after Jadhav radioed for help. A gun battle then ensued in which Khan was killed and Kasab was wounded. After a physical struggle, Kasab was arrested. A police officer, Tukaram Omble, was also killed when he tried to disarm Kasab by wrestling his weapon away from him.

Leopold Cafe 
The Leopold Cafe, a popular restaurant and bar on Colaba Causeway in South Mumbai, was one of the first sites to be attacked. Two attackers, Shoaib alias Soheb and Nazir alias Abu Umer, opened fire on the cafe on the evening of 26 November between 21:30 and 21:48, killing 10 people (including some foreigners) and injuring many more.

Bomb blasts in taxis 
There were two explosions in taxis caused by timer bombs. The first one occurred at 22:40 at Vile Parle, killing the driver and a passenger. The second explosion took place at Wadi Bunder between 22:20 and 22:25. Three people, including the driver of the taxi were killed, and about 15 others were injured.

Taj Mahal Palace Hotel and Oberoi Trident 

Two hotels, The Taj Mahal Palace Hotel and the Oberoi Trident, were among the four locations targeted. Six explosions were reported at the Taj Hotel – one in the lobby, two in the elevators, three in the restaurant – and one at the Oberoi Trident. At the Taj, firefighters rescued 200 hostages from windows using ladders during the first night.

CNN initially reported on the morning of 27 November 2008 that the hostage situation at the Taj Hotel had been resolved and quoted the police chief of Maharashtra stating that all hostages were freed; however, it was learned later that day that there were still two attackers holding hostages, including foreigners, in the Taj Hotel.

A number of European Parliament Committee on International Trade delegates were staying in the Taj Hotel when it was attacked, but none of them were injured. British Conservative Member of the European Parliament (MEP) Sajjad Karim (who was in the lobby when attackers initially opened fire there) and German Social Democrat MEP Erika Mann were hiding in different parts of the building. Also reported present was Spanish MEP Ignasi Guardans, who was barricaded in a hotel room. Another British Conservative MEP, Syed Kamall, reported that he along with several other MEPs left the hotel and went to a nearby restaurant shortly before the attack. Kamall also reported that Polish MEP Jan Masiel was thought to have been sleeping in his hotel room when the attacks started, but eventually left the hotel safely. Kamall and Guardans reported that a Hungarian MEP's assistant was shot. Also caught up in the shooting were the President of Madrid, Esperanza Aguirre, while checking in at the Oberoi Trident, and Indian MP N. N. Krishnadas of Kerala and Gulam Noon while having dinner at a restaurant in the Taj Hotel. Gautam Adani, a billionaire business tycoon of India was having dinner in Taj at 26 November night, he hid in the hotel basement for the night.

Nariman House 

Nariman House, a Chabad Lubavitch Jewish centre in Colaba known as the Mumbai Chabad House, was taken over by two attackers and several residents were held hostage. Police evacuated adjacent buildings and exchanged fire with the attackers, wounding one. Local residents were told to stay inside. The attackers threw a grenade into a nearby lane, causing no casualties. NSG commandos arrived from Delhi, and a naval helicopter took an aerial survey. During the first day, 9 hostages were rescued from the first floor. The following day, the house was stormed by NSG commandos fast-roping from helicopters onto the roof, covered by snipers positioned in nearby buildings. After a long battle, one NSG commando, Sergeant Gajender Singh Bisht was killed, as were both perpetrators. Rabbi Gavriel Holtzberg and his wife Rivka Holtzberg, who was six months pregnant, were murdered with four other hostages inside the house by the attackers.

According to radio transmissions picked up by Indian intelligence, the attackers "would be told by their handlers in Pakistan that the lives of Jews were worth 50 times those of non-Jews". Injuries on some of the bodies indicated that they may have been tortured.

NSG raid 
During the attacks, both hotels were surrounded by Rapid Action Force personnel and Marine Commandos (MARCOS) and National Security Guards (NSG) commandos. When reports emerged that attackers were receiving television broadcasts, feeds to the hotels were blocked. Security forces stormed both hotels, and all nine attackers were killed by the morning of 29 November. Major Sandeep Unnikrishnan of the NSG was fatally shot during the rescue of Commando Sunil Yadav, who was hit in the leg by a bullet during the rescue operations at Taj. 32 hostages were killed at the Oberoi Trident.

NSG commandos then took on the Nariman house, and a naval helicopter took an aerial survey. During the first day, 9 hostages were rescued from the first floor. The following day, the house was stormed by NSG commandos fast-roping from helicopters onto the roof, covered by snipers positioned in nearby buildings. NSG Commando Sergeant Gajender Singh Bisht, who was part of the team that fast-roped onto Nariman House, died after a long battle in which both perpetrators were also killed. By the morning of 28 November, the NSG had secured the Jewish outreach centre at Nariman House as well as the Oberoi Trident hotel. They also incorrectly believed that the Taj Palace and Towers had been cleared of attackers, and soldiers were leading hostages and holed-up guests to safety, and removing bodies of those killed in the attacks. However, later news reports indicated that there were still two or three attackers in the Taj, with explosions heard and gunfire exchanged. Fires were also reported at the ground floor of the Taj with plumes of smoke arising from the first floor. The final operation at the Taj Palace hotel was completed by the NSG commandos at 08:00 on 29 November, killing three attackers and resulting in the conclusion of the attacks. The NSG rescued 250 people from the Oberoi, 300 from the Taj and 60 people (members of 12 different families) from Nariman House. In addition, police seized a boat filled with arms and explosives anchored at Mazgaon dock off Mumbai Harbour.

Attribution 

The Mumbai attacks were planned and directed by Lashkar-e-Taiba militants inside Pakistan, and carried out by 10 young armed men trained and sent to Mumbai and directed from inside Pakistan via mobile phones and VoIP.

In July 2009 Pakistani authorities confirmed that LeT plotted and financed the attacks from LeT camps in Karachi and Thatta. In November 2009, Pakistani authorities charged seven men they had arrested earlier, of planning and executing the assault.

Mumbai police department originally identified 37 suspects—including two Pakistani army officers—for their alleged involvement in the plot. All but two of the suspects, many of whom are identified only through aliases, are Pakistani. David Coleman Headley and Tahawwur Hussain Rana, arrested in the United States in October 2009 for other attacks, were also found to have been involved in planning the Mumbai attacks. One of these men, Pakistani American David Headley (born Daood Sayed Gilani), was found to have made several trips to India before the attacks and gathered video and GPS information on behalf of the plotters.

In April 2011, the United States issued arrest warrants for four Pakistani men as suspects in the attack. The men, Sajid Mir, Abu Qahafa, Mazhar Iqbal alias "Major Iqbal", are believed to be members of Lashkar-e-Taiba and helped plan and train the attackers.

Negotiations with Pakistan 
Pakistani Prime Minister Yousaf Raza Gillani and President Asif Ali Zardari condemned the attacks. Pakistan promised to assist in the investigation and President Zardari vowed "strong action against any Pakistani elements found involved in the attack".

Pakistan initially denied that Pakistanis were responsible for the attacks, blaming plotters in Bangladesh and Indian criminals, a claim refuted by India, and saying they needed information from India on other bombings first.

Pakistani authorities finally agreed that Ajmal Kasab was a Pakistani on 7 January 2009, and registered a case against three other Pakistani nationals.

The Indian government supplied evidence to Pakistan and other governments, in the form of interrogations, weapons, and call records of conversations during the attacks. In addition, Indian government officials said that the attacks were so sophisticated that they must have had official backing from Pakistani "agencies", an accusation denied by Pakistan.

Under US and UN pressure, Pakistan arrested a few members of Jamaat ud-Dawa and briefly put its founder under house arrest, but he was found to be free a few days later. A year after the attacks, Mumbai police continued to complain that Pakistani authorities were not co-operating by providing information for their investigation. Meanwhile, journalists in Pakistan said security agencies were preventing them from interviewing people from Kasab's village. The then Home Minister P. Chidambaram said the Pakistani authorities had not shared any information about American suspects David Headley and Tahawwur Hussain Rana, but that the FBI had been more forthcoming.

An Indian report, summarising intelligence gained from India's interrogation of David Headley, was released in October 2010. It alleged that Pakistan's intelligence agency (ISI) had provided support for the attacks by providing funding for reconnaissance missions in Mumbai. The report included Headley's claim that Lashkar-e-Taiba's chief military commander, Zaki-ur-Rahman Lakhvi, had close ties to the ISI. He alleged that "every big action of LeT is done in close coordination with [the] ISI."

In 2018, during an interview with newspaper Dawn, Pakistan's former Prime Minister Nawaz Sharif reportedly indirectly accepted Pakistan's involvement in not preventing the Mumbai attacks.

Investigation 
According to investigations, the attackers travelled by sea from Karachi, Pakistan, across the Arabian Sea, hijacked the Indian fishing trawler Kuber, killed the crew of four, then forced the captain to sail to Mumbai. After murdering the captain, the attackers entered Mumbai on a rubber dinghy. The captain of Kuber, Amar Singh Solanki, had earlier been imprisoned for six months in a Pakistani jail for illegally fishing in Pakistani waters. The attackers stayed and were trained by the Lashkar-e-Taiba in a safehouse at Azizabad in Karachi before boarding a small boat for Mumbai.

David Headley was a member of Lashkar-e-Taiba, and between 2002 and 2009 Headley travelled extensively as part of his work for LeT. Headley received training in small arms and countersurveillance from LeT, built a network of connections for the group, and was chief scout in scoping out targets for Mumbai attack having allegedly been given $25,000 in cash in 2006 by an ISI officer known as Major Iqbal. The officer also helped him arrange a communications system for the attack, and oversaw a model of the Taj Hotel so that gunmen could know their way inside the target, according to Headley's testimony to Indian authorities. Headley also helped ISI recruit Indian agents to monitor Indian troop levels and movements, according to a US official. At the same time, Headley was also an informant for the US Drug Enforcement Administration, and Headley's wives warned American officials of Headley's involvement with LeT and his plotting attacks, warning specifically that the Taj Hotel may be their target.

US officials believed that the Inter-Services Intelligence (I.S.I.) officers provided support to Lashkar-e-Taiba militants who carried out the attacks. Disclosures made by former American intelligence contractor Edward Snowden in 2013 revealed that the Central Intelligence Agency (CIA) had intercepted communications between the Lashkar boat and the LeT headquarters in Pakistan-administered Kashmir and passed the alert on to RAW on 18 November, eight days before the terrorists actually struck Mumbai. In the hours after the attack, the New York City Police Department sent Brandon del Pozo, an official from their Intelligence Division, to investigate the incident in order to understand what vulnerabilities its methods posed for New York City.

The arrest of Zabiuddin Ansari alias Abu Hamza in June 2012 provided further clarity on how the plot was hatched. According to Abu Hamza, the attacks were previously scheduled for 2006, using Indian youth for the job. However, a huge cache of AK-47's and RDX, which were to be used for the attacks, was recovered from Aurangabad in 2006, thus leading to the dismantling of the original plot. Subsequently, Abu Hamza fled to Pakistan and along with Lashkar commanders, scouted for Pakistani youth to be used for the attacks. In September 2007, 10 people were selected for the mission. In September 2008, these people tried sailing to Mumbai from Karachi, but couldn't complete their mission due to choppy waters. These men made a second attempt in November 2008, and successfully managed to execute the final attacks. David Headley's disclosures, that three Pakistani army officers were associated with the planning and execution of the attack were substantiated by Ansari's revelations during his interrogation.

After Ansari's arrest, Pakistan's Foreign Office claimed they had received information that up to 40 Indian nationals were involved in the attacks.

Method 
The attackers had planned the attack several months ahead of time and knew some areas well enough to vanish and reappear after security forces had left. Several sources have quoted Kasab telling the police that the group received help from Mumbai residents. The attackers used at least three SIM cards purchased on the Indian side of the border with Bangladesh. There were also reports of a SIM card purchased in the US state of New Jersey. Police had also mentioned that Faheem Ansari, an Indian Lashkar operative who had been arrested in February 2008, had scouted the Mumbai targets for the November attacks. Later, the police arrested two Indian suspects, Mikhtar Ahmad, who is from Srinagar in Kashmir, and Tausif Rehman, a resident of Kolkata. They supplied the SIM cards, one in Calcutta, and the other in New Delhi.

The attackers used a satellite phone and cell phones to talk to each other as well as their handlers that were based in Pakistan. In transcripts intercepted by Indian authorities between the attackers and their handlers, the handlers provided the attackers with encouragement, tactical advice, and information gained from media coverage. The attackers used both personal cell phones and those obtained from their victims to communicate with each other and the news media. Although the attackers were encouraged to murder hostages, the attackers were in communication with the news media via cell phones to make demands in return for the release of hostages. This was believed to be done in order to further confuse Indian authorities that they were dealing with primarily a hostage situation.

Type 86 Grenades made by China's state-owned Norinco were used in the attacks.

There were also indications that the attackers had been taking steroids. The gunman who survived said that the attackers had used Google Earth to familiarise themselves with the locations of buildings used in the attacks.

There were 10 gunmen, nine of whom were subsequently shot dead and one captured by security forces. Witnesses reported that they seemed to be in their early twenties, wore black T-shirts and jeans, and that they smiled and looked happy as they shot their victims.

It was initially reported that some of the attackers were British citizens, but the Indian government later stated that there was no evidence to confirm this. Similarly, early reports of 12 gunmen were also later shown to be incorrect.

On 9 December, the 10 attackers were identified by Mumbai police, along with their home towns in Pakistan: Ajmal Amir Kasab from Faridkot, Abu Ismail Dera Ismail Khan from Dera Ismail Khan, Hafiz Arshad and Babr Imran from Multan, Javed from Okara, Shoaib from Sialkot, Nazir Ahmed and Nasir from Faisalabad, Abdul Rahman from Arifwalla, and Fahadullah from Dipalpur Taluka. Dera Ismail Khan is in the North-West Frontier Province; the rest of the towns are in Pakistani Punjab.

On 6 April 2010, the Home Minister of Maharashtra State, informed the Assembly that the bodies of the nine killed Pakistani gunmen from the 2008 attack on Mumbai were buried in a secret location in January 2010. The bodies had been in the mortuary of a Mumbai hospital after Muslim clerics in the city refused to let them be buried on their grounds.

Attackers 
Only one of the 10 attackers, Ajmal Kasab, survived the attack. He was hanged in Yerwada jail in 2012. The other nine attackers killed during the onslaught were Hafiz Arshad alias Abdul Rehman Bada, Abdul Rahman Chhota, Javed alias Abu Ali, Fahadullah alias Abu Fahad, Ismail Khan alias Abu Ismail, Babar Imran alias Abu Akasha, Nasir alias Abu Umar, Nazir alias Abu Umer and Shoaib alias Abu Soheb.

Arrests 

Ajmal Kasab was the only attacker arrested alive by police. At first, he deposed to police inspector Ramesh Mahale that he had come to India "to see Amitabh Bachchan's bungalow", and that he was apprehended by the Mumbai Police outside the bungalow. Much of the information about the attackers' preparation, travel, and movements comes from his subsequent confessions to the Mumbai police.

On 12 February 2009, Pakistan's Interior Minister Rehman Malik said that Pakistani national Javed Iqbal, who acquired VoIP phones in Spain for the Mumbai attackers, and Hamad Ameen Sadiq, who had facilitated money transfer for the attack, had been arrested. Two other men known as Khan and Riaz, but whose full names were not given, were also arrested. Two Pakistanis were arrested in Brescia, Italy (east of Milan) on 21 November 2009, after being accused of providing logistical support to the attacks and transferring more than US$200 to Internet accounts using a false ID. They had Red Corner Notices issued against them by Interpol for their suspected involvement and it was issued after the last year's strikes.

In October 2009, two Chicago men were arrested and charged by the FBI for involvement in "terrorism" abroad, David Coleman Headley and Tahawwur Hussain Rana. Headley, a Pakistani-American, was charged in November 2009 with scouting locations for the 2008 Mumbai attacks. Headley is reported to have posed as an American Jew and is believed to have links with militant Islamist groups based in Bangladesh. On 18 March 2010, Headley pleaded guilty to a dozen charges against him thereby avoiding going to trial.

In December 2009, the FBI charged Abdur Rehman Hashim Syed, a retired major in the Pakistani army, for planning the attacks in association with Headley.

On 15 January 2010, in a successful snatch operation R&AW agents nabbed Sheikh Abdul Khwaja, one of the handlers of the 26/11 attacks, chief of HuJI India operations and a most wanted suspect in India, from Colombo, Sri Lanka, and brought him over to Hyderabad, India for formal arrest.

On 25 June 2012, the Delhi Police Department arrested Zabiuddin Ansari alias Abu Hamza, one of the key suspects in the attack at the Indira Gandhi International Airport in New Delhi. His arrest was touted as the most significant development in the case since Kasab's arrest. Security agencies had been chasing him for three years in Delhi. Ansari is a Lashker-e-Taiba ultra and the Hindi tutor of the 10 attackers who were responsible for the Mumbai attacks in 2008. He was apprehended, after he was arrested and deported to India by Saudi Intelligence officials as per official request by Indian authorities. After Ansari's arrest, investigations revealed that in 2009 he allegedly stayed for a day in a room in Old Legislators's Hostel, belonging to Fauzia Khan, a former MLA and minister in Maharashtra Government. The minister, however, denied having any links with him. Home Minister P. Chidambaram asserted that Ansari was provided a safe place in Pakistan and was present in the control room, which could not have been established without active State support. Ansari's interrogation further revealed that Sajid Mir and a Pakistani Army major visited India under fake names as cricket spectators to survey targets in Delhi and Mumbai for about a fortnight.

Sajid Mir, a Pakistani citizen and key operative of the militant Islamic extremist group Lashkar-e-Taiba (LeT), is seen as one of the main organizers of the 2008 attacks. He has been called the "mastermind" and "project manager". Mir is on the U.S. Federal Bureau of Investigation's Most Wanted list and the United States Department of State offers in its Rewards for Justice Program, a reward of up to $5 million for information leading to the arrest and conviction of Mir. Mir has carried out terrorism operations in different parts of the world, including France.

Jason M. Blazakis, professor of practice at Middlebury Institute of International Studies at Monterey, stated in 2018 in The Hill: "A lethal, miasmic mix of bureaucratic inertia, diplomatic dysfunction and misperception has contributed to the fact that LeT members Sajid Mir, Mazhar Iqbal, Abu Qahafa (his nom de guerre), and their ISI handler, Major Iqbal (no relation to Mazhar), roam free."

A number of suspects were arrested on false charges. At least two of them spent nearly eight years in prison and were not paid any compensation by the Indian government.

Casualties and compensation 

A total of 175 people, including civilians, security personnel, and nine of the attackers, were killed in the attacks. Among the dead were 29 foreign nationals. One attacker was captured. The bodies of many of the dead hostages showed signs of torture or disfigurement. A number of those killed were notable figures in business, media, and security services.

The chief minister of Maharashtra, Vilasrao Deshmukh, stated that 15 policemen and two NSG commandos were killed, including the following officers:
Assistant Police Sub-Inspector Tukaram Omble, who succeeded in capturing a terrorist alive, with his bare hands.
Joint Commissioner of Police Hemant Karkare, the Chief of the Mumbai Anti-Terrorism Squad
Additional Commissioner of Police: Ashok Kamte
Encounter specialist Senior Inspector Vijay Salaskar
Senior Inspector Shashank Shinde
NSG Commando, Major Sandeep Unnikrishnan
NSG Commando, Hawaldar Gajender Singh Bisht
Three railway officials of Chhatrapati Shivaji Maharaj Terminus were also killed.

The casualties occurred in the following locations:

In August 2009, the Indian Hotels Company and the Oberoi Group received about US$28 million as part-payment of the insurance claims, on account of the attacks on Taj and Trident, from General Insurance Corporation of India.

Aftermath 

The attacks are sometimes referred to in India as "26/11", after the date in 2008 that the attacks began. The Pradhan Inquiry Commission, appointed by the Maharashtra government, produced a report that was tabled before the legislative assembly more than a year after the events. The report said the "war-like" attack was beyond the capacity to respond of any police force, but also found fault with the Mumbai Police Commissioner Hasan Gafoor's lack of leadership during the crisis.

The Maharashtra government planned to buy 36 speed boats to patrol the coastal areas and several helicopters for the same purpose. It also planned to create an anti-terror force called "Force One" and upgrade all the weapons that Mumbai police currently have. Prime Minister Manmohan Singh on an all-party conference declared that legal framework would be strengthened in the battle against terrorism and a federal anti-terrorist intelligence and investigation agency, like the FBI, will be set up soon to co-ordinate action against terrorism. The government strengthened anti-terror laws with UAPA 2008, and the federal National Investigation Agency was formed.

The attacks further strained India's slowly recovering relationship with Pakistan. India's then External Affairs Minister Pranab Mukherjee declared that India may indulge in military strikes against terror camps in Pakistan to protect its territorial integrity. There were also after-effects on the United States's relationships with both countries, the US-led NATO war in Afghanistan, and on the Global War on Terror. FBI chief Robert Mueller praised the "unprecedented cooperation" between American and Indian intelligence agencies over the Mumbai terror attack probe. However, Interpol secretary general Ronald Noble said that Indian intelligence agencies did not share any information with Interpol.

A new National Counter Terrorism Centre (NCTC) was proposed to be set up by the then-Home Minister P. Chidambaram as an office to collect, collate, summarise, integrate, analyse, co-ordinate and report all information and inputs received from various intelligence agencies, state police departments, and other ministries and their departments.

Movement of troops 
Pakistan moved troops towards the border with India voicing concerns about the Indian government's possible plans to launch attacks on Pakistani soil if it did not co-operate. After days of talks, the Pakistan government, however, decided to start moving troops away from the border.

Reactions 

Indians criticised their political leaders after the attacks, saying that their ineptness was partly responsible. The Times of India commented on its front page that "Our politicians fiddle as innocents die." Political reactions in Mumbai and India included a range of resignations and political changes, including the resignations of Minister for Home Affairs Shivraj Patil, Chief Minister Vilasrao Deshmukh and deputy chief minister R. R. Patil for controversial reactions to the attack including taking the former's son and Bollywood director Ram Gopal Verma to tour the damaged Taj Hotel and the latters remarks that the attacks were not a big deal in such a large city. Indian Muslims condemned the attacks and refused to bury the attackers. Groups of Muslims marched against the attacks and mosques observed silence. Prominent Muslim personalities such as Bollywood actor Aamir Khan appealed to their community members in the country to observe Eid al-Adha as a day of mourning on 9 December. The business establishment also reacted, with changes to transport, and requests for an increase in self-defence capabilities. The attacks also triggered a chain of citizens' movements across India such as the India Today Group's "War Against Terror" campaign. There were vigils held across all of India with candles and placards commemorating the victims of the attacks. The NSG commandos based in Delhi also met criticism for taking ten hours to reach the three sites under attack.

International reaction for the attacks was widespread, with many countries and international organisations condemning the attacks and expressing their condolences to the civilian victims. Many important personalities around the world also condemned the attacks.

Media coverage highlighted the use of social media and social networking tools, including Twitter and Flickr, in spreading information about the attacks. In addition, many Indian bloggers offered live textual coverage of the attacks. A map of the attacks was set up by a web journalist using Google Maps. The New York Times, in July 2009, described the event as "what may be the most well-documented terrorist attack anywhere".

In November 2010, families of American victims of the attacks filed a lawsuit in Brooklyn, New York, naming Lt. Gen. Ahmed Shuja Pasha, chief of the ISI, as being complicit in the Mumbai attacks. On 22 September 2011, the attack on the American Embassy in Afghanistan was attributed to Pakistan via cell phone records identical to the attacks in Mumbai, also linked to Pakistan.

Trials

Kasab's trial 
Kasab's trial was delayed due to legal issues, as many Indian lawyers were unwilling to represent him. A Mumbai Bar Association passed a resolution proclaiming that none of its members would represent Kasab. However, the Chief Justice of India stated that Kasab needed a lawyer for a fair trial. A lawyer for Kasab was eventually found, but was replaced due to a conflict of interest. On 25 February 2009, Indian investigators filed an 11,000-page chargesheet, formally charging Kasab with murder, conspiracy, and waging war against India among other charges.

Kasab's trial began on 23 March 2009, and he pled not guilty on 6 May 2009. On 10 June 2009, Devika Rotawan, a child who had been shot in her leg during the attack, identified Kasab as one of the attackers during her testimony. He pled guilty on 20 July 2009. The judge found many of the 86 charges were not addressed in his confession, and therefore the trial continued 23 July 2009. Kasab initially apologised for the attacks and said he deserved the death penalty for his crimes, but on 18 December 2009, retracted his confession, and said he had been forced by police to make his confession.

Kasab was convicted of all 86 charges on 3 May 2010. He was found guilty of murder for directly killing seven people, conspiracy to commit murder for the deaths of the 164 people killed in the three-day terror siege, waging war against India, causing terror, and of conspiracy to murder two high-ranking police officers. On 6 May 2010, he was sentenced to death by hanging. However, he appealed his sentence at high court. On 21 February 2011, the Bombay High Court upheld the death sentence of Kasab, dismissing his appeal.

On 29 August 2012, the Indian Supreme Court upheld the death sentence for Kasab. The court stated, "We are left with no option but to award death penalty. The primary and foremost offence committed by Kasab is waging war against the Government of India". The verdict followed 10 weeks of appeal hearings, and was decided by a two-judge Supreme Court panel, which was led by Judge Aftab Alam. The panel rejected arguments that Kasab was denied a free and fair trial.

Kasab filed a mercy petition with the President of India, which was rejected on 5 November. Kasab was hanged in Pune's Yerwada jail in secret on 21 November 2012 at 7:30 am named as operation 'X'. The Indian embassy in Islamabad informed the Pakistan government about Kasab's hanging through a letter. Pakistan refused to take the letter, which was then faxed to them. His family in Pakistan was sent news of his hanging via a courier.

In Pakistan 
Indian and Pakistani police exchanged DNA evidence, photographs and items found with the attackers to piece together a detailed portrait of the Mumbai plot. Police in Pakistan arrested seven people, including Hammad Amin Sadiq, a homoeopathic pharmacist, who arranged bank accounts and secured supplies. Sadiq and six others began their formal trial on 3 October 2009 in Pakistan. Indian authorities said the prosecution stopped well short of top Lashkar leaders. In November 2009, Indian Prime Minister Manmohan Singh said that Pakistan had not done enough to bring the perpetrators of the attacks to justice.

An eight-member commission comprising defence lawyers, prosecutors and a court official was allowed to travel to India on 15 March 2013 to gather evidence for the prosecution of seven suspects linked to the 2008 Mumbai attacks. However, the defence lawyers were barred from cross-examining the four prosecution witnesses in the case including Ajmal Kasab. On the eve of the first anniversary of 26/11, a Pakistani anti-terror court formally charged seven accused, including LeT operations commander Zaki ur Rehman Lakhvi. However, the actual trial started on 5 May 2012. The Pakistani court conducting trial of Mumbai attacks accused, reserved its judgement on the application filed by Lakhvi, challenging the report of the judicial panel, to 17 July 2012. On 17 July 2012, the court refused to take the findings of the Pakistani judicial commission as part of the evidence. However, it ruled that if a new agreement, which allows the panel's examination of witnesses, is reached, the prosecution may make an application for sending the panel to Mumbai.
The Indian Government, upset over the court ruling, however, contended that evidence collected by the Pakistani judicial panel has evidential value to punish all those involved in the attack. On 21 September 2013, a Pakistani judicial commission arrived in India to carry out the investigation and to cross examine the witnesses. This is the second such visit: the one in March 2012 was not a success as its report was rejected by an anti-terrorism court in Pakistan due to lack of evidence.

In the United States 
The LeT operative David Headley (born Daood Sayed Gilani) in his testimony before a Chicago federal court during co-accused Tahawwur Rana's trial revealed that Mumbai Chabad House was added to the list of targets for surveillance given by his Inter Services Intelligence handler Major Iqbal, though the Oberoi Hotel, one of the sites attacked, was not originally on the list.
On 10 June 2011, Tahawwur Rana was acquitted of plotting the 2008 Mumbai attacks, but was held guilty on two other charges. He was sentenced to 14 years in federal prison on 17 January 2013.

David Headley pleaded guilty to 12 counts related to the attacks, including conspiracy to commit murder in India and aiding and abetting in the murder of six Americans. On 23 January 2013, he was sentenced to 35 years in federal prison. His plea that he not be extradited to India, Pakistan or Denmark was accepted.

Memorials 
On the first anniversary of the event, the state paid homage to the victims of the attack. Force One—a new security force created by the Maharashtra government—staged a parade from Nariman Point to Chowpatty. Other memorials and candlelight vigils were also organised at the various locations where the attacks occurred.

On the second anniversary of the event, homage was again paid to the victims.

On the 10th anniversary of the 26/11 Mumbai terror attacks, Nariman House, one of the several establishments that were targeted by the Lashkar-e-Taiba terrorists, were to be declared a memorial and renamed as Nariman Light House.

The Indian Express group hosts an annual memorial event, 26/11 – Stories of Strength, in Mumbai to pay homage to those killed in the ghastly terror attacks in the city in 2008. The memorial event started in 2016, is now organised at the Gateway of India and brings forth the inspiring stories of courage and strength of more than 100 survivors that the Indian Express has interviewed over the past decade. Actor Amitabh Bachchan has been the brand ambassador for the event over the years.

Published accounts

Documentaries 
Mumbai Massacre (2009), television documentary film by Victoria Midwinter Pitt about survivors of the attack. Originally broadcast by the Australian Broadcasting Corporation, it was re-edited for PBS' Secrets of the Dead as the episode "Mumbai Massacre", it was also shown in Four Corners as the twenty-sixth episode of season 49.
Terror in Mumbai (2009), British television documentary film by Dan Reed, broadcast by HBO which features audio tapes of the intercepted phone calls between the young gunmen and their controllers in Pakistan, and testimony from the sole surviving gunman.
Mumbai Terror Attacks (2010), Indian television documentary film by Ashish R. Shukla produced by Miditech and broadcast by Nat Geo India.
"City Under Siege" (2012), directed by Matthew Hinchcliffe, first episode of the television documentary series Black Ops with a focus on the rescue operation during the attacks.
"Terror in Mumbai" (2011), directed by Mike Phillips, fourth episode of the American television docudrama series Got Home Alive, about foreign tourists caught in the attacks.
"Mumbai Massacre" (2012), directed by Stan Griffin, sixth episode of season 5 of the television docudrama series Seconds from Disaster, focusing on intelligence failures which lead to the attacks.
"Operation Black Tornado" (2018), third episode of the Indian television documentary series Battle Ops on the online channel Veer by Discovery.
Rubaru Roshni (2019), Indian documentary film by Svati Chakravarty Bhatkal broadcast by Star India, about survivors of the attacks.

Films 
Crackers (2011), Indian animated film by Anil Goyal, inspired by the attacks.
Shahid (2012), Indian biographical drama film by Hansal Mehta, based on the life of lawyer and human rights activist Shahid Azmi - assassinated in 2010 after agreeing to defend Faheem Ansari who was accused of abetting the terrorists (was later found not-guilty by the courts).
The Attacks of 26/11 (2013), Indian action thriller film directed by Ram Gopal Varma, depicting the attacks based on the book Kasab: The Face of 26/11 by Rommel Rodrigues with a focus on Ajmal Kasab.
Arrambam (2013), Indian action-thriller film by Vishnuvardhan about counter-terrorism operations in India, inspired by the attacks.
Phantom (2015), Indian action-thriller film by Kabir Khan, an alternative-historical account about the assassination of Lashkar-e-Taiba chief Hafiz Saeed.
Taj Mahal (2015), French-Belgian thriller-drama film directed and written by Nicolas Saada. It was screened in the Horizons section at the 72nd Venice International Film Festival. The film is about an 18-year-old French girl who was alone in her hotel room when the terrorists attacked the hotel.
Mumbai Siege: 4 Days of Terror (also known as One Less God) (2017), independent Australian film directed by Lliam Worthington, featuring the situation of some foreigners inside Taj Hotel.
Hotel Mumbai (2019), action thriller film directed by Anthony Maras and written by John Collee and Maras. It has come under criticism for omitting any reference to the role of Pakistan in the terror strikes.
Sooryavanshi (2021), Indian action film by Rohit Shetty set in the aftermath of the counter-terrorism operations following the attacks.
Major (2022), an Indian biographical-action film directed by Sashi Kiran Tikka. Shot simultaneously in Telugu and Hindi languages, the film is based on the life of Major Sandeep Unnikrishnan, who was killed while rescuing hostages during the attacks.

Television 
State of Siege: 26/11 (2020), Indian Hindi-language web series released on ZEE5, showing the attacks from the perspective of NSG Commandos. It is based on the book Black Tornado: The Three Sieges of Mumbai 26/11 by journalist Sandeep Unnithan.
Mumbai Diaries 26/11 (2021), Indian Hindi-language medical drama series on Amazon Prime Video. The series is directed by Nikhil Advani and Nikhil Gonsalves. It follows the staff of Bombay General Hospital during the night of the attacks.

Books 
Kasab: The Face of 26/11 (2010) by Rommel Rodrigues focuses on Ajmal Kasab, the sole terrorist who was caught. It is the basis of the aforementioned film The Attacks of 26/11.
The Siege: The Attack on the Taj is a non-fiction book by Cathy Scott-Clerk and Adrian Levy. It is an account of the 2008 attacks on The Taj Mahal Palace Hotel in Mumbai, India, during the night of 26 November 2008. The book was first published by Penguin Books in 2013.
In 2014, Black Tornado: The Three Sieges of Mumbai 26/11 was published by Indian journalist Sandeep Unnnithan, a non-fiction book, presented a blow-by-blow account of the terrorist strike and how the siege of Mumbai was thwarted by India’s security forces. The book covers the heroic efforts of Marine Commandos of Indian Navy as well as an ill-equipped yet valiant Mumbai Police. But its primary focus is on the 51 Special Action Group of National Security Guards, commanded by the decorated Indian Army Special Forces officer, then Colonel, now Brigadier. Sunil Sheoran Sena Medal (Bar). The book delves into the reasons for the delayed arrival of the NSG, including incredible facts like the then Home Minister of India, Shivraj Patil, wanted to fly in the NSG aircraft and came 1 hour late to board the plane which inturn delayed the NSG's arrival into the city and that the then Southern Army Commander, Lt. General. Noble Thamburaj, notoriously toured the Taj Mahal Palace Hotel with his wife while the NSG operation was still on. It was adapted into the web series State of Siege: 26/11 (2020).
Aziz Burney wrote a book titled 26/11: RSS ki Saazish? ("26/11: An RSS conspiracy?") hinting that Rashtriya Swayamsevak Sangh was somehow linked to the attack and launched the book in presence of Congress leader Digvijaya Singh. Later as RSS filed a case against him, he had to apologise for it.
In his 2020 memoirs, Let Me Say It Now, former IPS officer Rakesh Maria, who was given the responsibility of investigating the attacks and personally interrogated Ajmal Kasab, revealed the extent to which terrorists had gone to ensure their bodies would be mis-identified as Hindus, to lend credence to the narrative that the attack was the handiwork of Hindu extremists, and thus provide the Pakistani authorities with plausible deniability. According to Maria, Lashkar-e-Taiba wanted Kasab to be killed as a Bengaluru resident named ‘Samir Dinesh Chaudhari’, with a "red (sacred) thread" tied around his wrist to portray the attack as a case of ‘Hindu terror’, but their plan apparently did not succeed and the police nabbed Kasab. LeT had even given each terrorist a fake identity card listing an Indian address, to further strengthen the circumstantial narrative. If everything went according to plan, Kasab would have died as Chaudhari and the media would have blamed 'Hindu terrorists' for the attack. Kasab, in his confessional account, acknowledged this plot, as did David Coleman Headley, who corroborated this account by confirming that the sacred threads to be worn around the terrorists' wrists to identify them as Hindus, were procured from Mumbai's Siddhivinayak Temple.

See also 

1993 Bombay bombings
2006 Mumbai train bombings
Attack on American Consulate, Kolkata
The Attacks of 26/11
Sarah Avraham
Bowbazaar Bomb Blast 1993
Hotel Mumbai
List of Islamist terrorist attacks
Mumbai Diaries 26/11
November 2015 Paris attacks
Phantom
The Siege: The Attack on the Taj
Survivor registry
Westgate centre shootings

Explanatory notes

References

Further reading

External links 

Incident Summary at the Global Terrorism Database
2008 Mumbai Attacks. Rewards for Justice.

 [Interview of captured terrorist Mohammed Ajmal Amir Qasab]

Web of Terror. PBS Frontline. WGBH (interactive journalism).

 
2008 in international relations
2008 mass shootings in Asia
2008 attacks
21st-century mass murder in India
Antisemitism in India
Attacks on buildings and structures in 2008
Attacks on buildings and structures in India
Attacks on hospitals
Attacks on hotels in Asia
Building bombings in India
Car and truck bombings in India
Chhatrapati Shivaji Terminus
Grenade attacks
Hotel bombings
Hostage taking in India
Improvised explosive device bombings in 2008
India–Pakistan relations
Islam and antisemitism
Islamic terrorism in India
Islamic terrorist incidents in 2008
Jewish Indian history
Lashkar-e-Taiba attacks
Manmohan Singh administration
Mass murder in 2008
2008 attacks
Mass shootings in India
2008 attacks
November 2008 crimes
November 2008 events in India
Railway accidents and incidents in Maharashtra
Spree shootings in India
Terrorist incidents in India in 2008
2008 attacks
Terrorist incidents on railway systems in Asia
Urban warfare
Filmed killings in Asia
Filmed improvised explosive device bombings
Filmed executions